Baron Gábor Kemény (14 December 1910 – 19 March 1946) was a Hungarian politician, who served as Minister of Foreign Affairs in the Government of National Unity led by Szálasi between 1944 and 1945. He prevented the diplomatic protests against the terror. After the fall of Budapest he tried to escape into Western Europe, but the arriving American troops captured him with other members of the Arrow Cross Party's government. He was tried by the People's Tribunal in Budapest in open sessions and sentenced to death for war crimes and high treason. Kemény was hanged in 1946 in Budapest. He was the youngest member of that Government.

References
 Magyar Életrajzi Lexikon

1910 births
1946 deaths
Politicians from Budapest
Foreign ministers of Hungary
Hungarian people of World War II
Hungarian people convicted of war crimes
Executed Hungarian collaborators with Nazi Germany
People executed by Hungary by hanging
Gabor
Hungarian fascists
Hungarian Nazis
People executed for war crimes
Arrow Cross Party politicians

Prisoners and detainees of the United States military